Bernard Jackson (born October 22, 1961) is an American former sprinter.

References

1961 births
Living people
American male sprinters
Athletes (track and field) at the 1983 Pan American Games
Pan American Games gold medalists for the United States
Pan American Games bronze medalists for the United States
Pan American Games medalists in athletics (track and field)
Universiade medalists in athletics (track and field)
Universiade bronze medalists for the United States
Medalists at the 1983 Summer Universiade
Medalists at the 1983 Pan American Games